The puff-backed honeyeater (Meliphaga aruensis) is a species of bird in the family Meliphagidae. 
It is widely spread throughout New Guinea.
Its natural habitats are subtropical or tropical moist lowland forests and subtropical or tropical moist montane forests.

References

External links
Image at ADW

puff-backed honeyeater
Birds of New Guinea
puff-backed honeyeater
Taxonomy articles created by Polbot